USS Anoka may refer to the following ships operated by the United States Navy:

, a  laid down 1941 and struck in 1957
, a  launched in 1970 and struck in 2001.

United States Navy ship names